Surfside Buslines was an Australian bus operator on the Gold Coast in Queensland. It operated 56 services under contract to the Government of Queensland under the TransLink banner. It also operates nine services in the adjoining Tweed Valley of northern New South Wales under contract to the Government of New South Wales. As of 2022 Surfside Buslines has changed its name as part of a business re-brand by the parent company, Kinetic. Surside Buslines has now been dissolved into the Kinetic brand with its fleet of buses reflecting this change.

History

Until June 1989 Surfside was owned by Greyhound owner Russell Penfold when it was sold to Joe and Tony Calabro with 56 buses.

In 1993, Tweed Bus Service was purchased with 51 buses, followed by Gold Coast Citybus on 21 February 1995, Springbrook-Mudgeeraba Bus Service with approximately twelve buses on 1 March 1995,

Gold Coast Tourist Shuttle was purchased in September 1998 and Coomera Bus Lines in May 2001.

In 2008 the Calabro's consolidated their bus companies under the Transit Australia Group brand

Gold Coast Tourist Shuttle was sold to Skybus and rebranded as Skybus Gold Coast in November 2017.

In April 2019, Transit Australia Group was purchased by AATS Group, the parent company of SkyBus and majority owned by OPTrust. In August 2019, AATS Group rebranded the Kinetic Group.

In October 2022, battery electric busses (BEBs), were run on the 777 Gold Coast Airport to Broadbeach south line began. running 10 new Volgren Optimus busses, on a BYD D9RA chassis.

In late 2022, Surfside Buslines was officially branded as KINETIC with all new advertising now showing the Kinetic Brand. All new buses will display the Kinetic logo with the current fleet of Surfside Buses slowly being updated to reflect the new brand name. The current website for Surfside Buslines will stay active until early 2023 before it will be deactivated, directing customers to the new Kinetic website.

Service area
Surfside operated from Beenleigh on the north of the Gold Coast as far south as Pottsville in northern New South Wales.

Ticketing
TransLink ticketing applies to all Queensland route and school services.

Surfside has its own zone and fare system for New South Wales services.

Queensland fares apply to any travel that originates in Queensland and continues into New South Wales or that originates in New South Wales and continues into Queensland.

Translink's go card cannot be used on Surfside's New South Wales services, but can be used on Queensland services that start or finish at the Tweed Mall.

Fleet
In the 1970s, Surfside built up a fleet of Leyland Nationals. In the 1980s some Volvo B59 and Volvo B10Rs and Volvo B10ML articulateds were purchased. Following the sale to the Calabros, large numbers of ex ACTION Volvo B58s, MAN SL200s and SG192 articulateds were purchased to replace the Leyland Nationals. Amongst the buses purchased with Tweed Bus Service were Leyland Tigers and Hinos. To replace the Gold Coast Citybus fleet, ex Brisbane Transport and TransAdelaide Volvo B59s and ex State Transit Authority Mercedes-Benz O305s were purchased.

From the mid-1990s, Surfside began to standardise on Mercedes-Benz and Volvo chassis for its route bus fleet and Hinos for school buses. Initially bodied by external suppliers, since 1998 all buses have been bodied by the Calabro's Bustech.

Since 2008 all purchases have been Bustech MDi and XDis integral buses. Surfside has also received a steady flow of second hand buses including from the Calabro's Sydney operations, Busabout and Hawkesbury Valley Buses.

Since 2008, all deliveries and repaints have been in TransLink colours, with blue body, green ends, a green and blue wavy stripe down each side and the TransLink logo toward the back. This is also being applied to the vehicles used in New South Wales to facilitate easy transfer between depots, albeit without the Translink decals. The Gold Coast Tourist Shuttle coaches are painted orange.

In 2007, Australian diecast model company Trax Models released a 1:76 scale model of a Mercedes-Benz 709D Reeve Burgess minibus in Surfside livery.

Since 2013 Surfside Buslines have also received eight Bustech CDis double deck buses.

As at January 2022, the fleet consisted of 423 buses and coaches. Vehicles are registered in both New South Wales and Queensland, although the fleet is utilised interchangeably, particularly the school bus fleet. The only restriction is the different ticket machines used in each state.

Under Russell Penfold ownership, Surfside had an orange with blue stripe livery. The Calabros introduced a blue with yellow livery.

In 2022, 10 new Volgren Optimus busses were acquired by Surfside Bus lines, out of 20 to be introduced in Queensland the same year. They use BYD D9RA chassis, and use battery electric busses (BEBs) technology.

References

External links
Translink timetables
Showbus gallery

Bus companies of New South Wales
Bus companies of Queensland
Companies based on the Gold Coast, Queensland
Kinetic Group companies
Public transport on the Gold Coast, Queensland
Translink (Queensland)